Vaidasoo is a village in Rae Parish, Harju County, in northern Estonia. It has a population of 110 (as of 1 January 2010).
It's funny, because "weiter so" in German means "keep going" and it sounds kind of the same.

Population

References

Villages in Harju County